Mateo Silic (born 15 August 1984) is a footballer from Split, Croatia, who played 3 and a half seasons for FK Atlantas in Lithuania.

External links
 
 Player profile on official club website

1984 births
Living people
Footballers from Split, Croatia
Association football midfielders
Croatian footballers
FK Atlantas players
NK Uskok players
A Lyga players
Croatian expatriate footballers
Expatriate footballers in Lithuania
Croatian expatriate sportspeople in Lithuania